Eline Van Der Velden (born May 12 1986) is a Dutch comedian, writer, actress and producer based in London, England.

Early life
Van der Velden was born on the Dutch island of Curaçao, Netherlands Antilles to Dutch businessman Steven van der Velden and physiotherapist Quirine van der Velden. She moved to the United Kingdom at age 14 to study drama and musical theatre at The Arts Educational School, Tring Park. After high school, she concentrated on physics and graduated with an M.Sc. in Physics from Imperial College London in 2008.

Career
She was nominated by the International Academy of Digital Arts and Sciences for the Lovie Awards and won Best Online Comedy in 2013 for two of her submitted entries.
The People's Lovie Award also went to her sketch Match.com Parody.

She has created multiple online shows such as Sketch My Life with London Hughes and Emily Hartridge and the Match.com Parody.
She became managing director of Makerschannel.co.uk, the first curated video platform in Europe in 2015. Makers Channel has been recently acquired by  Belgian media company, De Persgroep, due to its success in the Netherlands.

She is the founder of a production company, Particle 6 Productions, a full service digital agency focused on video content.

In 2016, she was the face of Dutch Shampoo Andrelon and is known for her character Miss Holland. In 2016, Miss Holland made headlines as she asked the British public to teach her the National Anthem.

As an actress she has starred in Dutch TV series De Troon, Beatrix and the Golden Calf-winning series Overspel. In Belgium she appeared opposite Jamie Dornan in Flying Home.

Van der Velden starred in the BBC Three series "Putting it out there" where she challenges social perceptions of body hair, heels, spit, personal space and authority figures.

In 2018 she starred in BBC 1 Northern Ireland's comedy Series Soft Border Patrol and the BBC Three comedy series Miss Holland.

Awards and recognition
Miss Holland won the Best Online Comedy at the 2013 Lovie Awards, judged by Stephen Fry. The Match.com Parody video won Best Online Comedy People's Lovie Award, the people's vote. Her digital series Miss Holland and Match.com Parody Date 1 were also featured in the 2013 Google Lovie Letters.

She was the no.1 MotionMaker on DailyMotion, selected for the DailyMotion CinemaSelects. Her work was featured at the LA Webfest.

References

External links
 

Living people
21st-century Dutch actresses
Dutch producers
Dutch women comedians
Dutch women writers
1986 births
Alumni of Imperial College London
People educated at Tring Park School for the Performing Arts